Adam Koenig (born February 22, 1971) is an American politician serving as a member of the Kentucky House of Representatives from the 69th district.

Education
Koenig graduated from Covington Catholic High School in 1989. He earned a Bachelor of Arts degree in political science from Miami University.

Career
Koenig was the primary sponsor to a change in the law that prevents federally-certified radiologists from analyzing X-rays to assess black lung compensation claims, restricting such determinations to pulmonologists.

Elections
2012: Koenig was unopposed for both the May 22, 2012 Republican Primary, and the November 6, 2012 General election, winning with 13,337 votes.
2010 Koenig was challenged in the May 18, 2010 Republican Primary, winning with 2,209 votes (66.7%) and was unopposed for the November 2, 2010 General election, winning with 8,646 votes.
2008: Koenig was unopposed for the 2008 Republican Primary, and won the November 4, 2008 General election with 9,592 votes (56.6%) against Democratic nominee Merrick Krey.
2006: When district 69 Representative Jon Reinhardt retired and left his seat open, Koenig won the three-way 2006 Republican Primary with 767 votes (42.2%) and won the November 7, 2006 General election with 5,351 votes (50.9%) against Democratic nominee Randy Blankenship.
2003: To challenge incumbent Democratic Kentucky State Treasurer Jonathan Miller, Koenig was unopposed for the Republican Primary, but lost the November 2003 General election to Miller.

References

External links
Official page  at the Kentucky General Assembly
Campaign site

Adam Koenig at Ballotpedia
Adam Koenig at OpenSecrets

|-

1971 births
Living people
Republican Party members of the Kentucky House of Representatives
Miami University alumni
Politicians from Covington, Kentucky
21st-century American politicians
Covington Catholic High School alumni